Gamio is a surname. Notable people with the surname include:

Manuel Gamio (1883–1960), Mexican anthropologist, archaeologist, and sociologist
Pedro José Rada y Gamio (1873–1938), Peruvian politician

See also
Gami (disambiguation)